Boxhole is a young impact crater located approximately 180 km (265 km by road) north-east of Alice Springs in the Northern Territory, Australia. It is 170 metres in diameter and its age is estimated to be 5,400 ± 1,500 years based on the cosmogenic 14C terrestrial age of the meteorite, placing it in the Holocene. The crater is exposed to the surface.

Description 
In 1937 Joe Webb, a shearer at Boxhole sheep station, took geologist Cecil Madigan to examine the crater. Madigan discovered nickel-bearing metallic fragments and iron shale-balls similar to those found at Henbury to the south of Alice Springs.  It was the second impact crater to be described in Australia, after Henbury.
A later search found additional meteoritic metal including an iron mass of 181 pounds (82 kg) , now in the Natural History Museum, London.

See also

List of impact craters in Australia

References

Further reading 
 Cassidy, W. A., Descriptions and topographic maps of the Wolf Creek and Boxhole craters, Australia (abstract). French, B.M. and Short, N.M., eds., Shock Metamorphism of Natural Materials, Mono Book Corp., Baltimore, MD, p. 623. 1968
 Shoemaker, E. M., Roddy, D.J., Shoemaker, C.S. and Roddy,J.K., The Boxhole meteorite crater, Northern territory, Australia (abstract). Lunar and Planetary Science XIX, pp. 1081–1082. 1988

External links 
 Particles around Boxhole meteorite crater.
 Natural History Museum (Boxhole Meteorite)

Impact craters of the Northern Territory
Holocene impact craters
Quaternary Australia
Geology of the Northern Territory